Matthias Alexander Kristian Zimmermann (* 6 May 1981 in Basel) is a writer, painter and new media artist from Switzerland.

Biography 
Matthias A. K. Zimmermann was born in Basel and grew up in the canton of Aargau. He studied music/composition at the University of Arts Berne, fine art at the Lucerne University of Applied Sciences and Arts, game design and art education at the Zurich University of Applied Sciences and didactics/pedagogy at the Swiss Federal Institute for Vocational Education and Training (SFIVET). His artistic work has found a reception in international exhibitions as well as in scientific and essayistic texts. Zimmermann's artworks are in collections of various museums. His debut novel, CRYONIUM, has been published by Kulturverlag Kadmos (Kadmos Publisher).

Work

Literary work 
 CRYONIUM. The Experiments of Memory. Novel. Kulturverlag Kadmos (Kadmos Publisher), Berlin 2019, .

Artistic work

Content, concept and execution 
Zimmermann's artistic works, which he refers to as "Model Worlds", contain a smorgasbord of visual languages borrowed from digital space, the vocabulary of different cultures, and the history of art, design, and media. Computer game elements, source codes, japanese gardens, Buddhist symbolism, and icon paintings from the Middle Ages can be found predominantly. The pictorial motifs show landscapes in varying degrees of abstraction. This ranges from photorealistic, clearly recognizable places to spatial entities. The pictorial motifs convey both cheerful and gloomy atmospheres that paraphrase utopian and dystopian scenarios. The staging of the pictorial space using things from different times and places illustrates the simultaneity of virtual distance resolution. The geometric frameworks of the pictorial contents result from the most Miscellaneous perspectives and spatial representations. Each picture is based on a system that is constructed like a construction kit or puzzle and illustrates the playful concept of modularity – the variable combination, transformation, and ever new composition. The "Model Worlds" are designed as paintings on canvas or digitally constructed on the computer and implemented as Diasec. Each painting is preceded by meticulous sketch studies that last for months or years. Zimmermann's creative process reflects the interface of the analog and digital. His painting technique adapts the aesthetics of computer images, whereas his digitally created pictures mostly refer to motifs of classical painting.

Artistic Research 
The art book Digital Modernity  (Hirmer Publishers), published in 2018, discusses Zimmermann's work primarily under the aspect of artistic research. By combining elements of aesthetic mediation with those of the knowledge system, new epistemological spaces are opened up for the reception of art. The "Model Worlds" form a topology through space and time, research in the history of art, design and media, and point out technical connections. The series of pictures, The Space Machine, layers the picture content in six levels – energy, hardware, binary code, 3D graphics software, game world (electronic visual display), source codes – and illustrates the construction of digital worlds. Among other things, the source codes shown have the function of source references.

Museums

Exhibitions 
 Museum of Art Aarau, Switzerland: Selection 11, 2011
 Art Museum of Lucerne, Switzerland: Annual Exhibition, 2011
 Computer Games Museum Berlin, Germany: Model Worlds – Pictures by Matthias Zimmermann, 2013
 Computer Games Museum Berlin/Institution of Digital Culture, Germany: Supersample – Pixels at an Exhibition, 2015
 Museet for Religiøs Kunst, Denmark: Vokseværk, 2015
 St. Anne's Museum Quarter, Lübeck/Landeshaus Kiel, Germany: KunSt aktuell im LandesHaus, 2015
 Ludwig Museum of Art, Germany: Matthias Zimmermann – From Videogame towards the Apocalypse, 2016
 Ludwig Museum of Art, Germany: The Known and the Unknown, 2019
 Museum of Art Aarau, Switzerland: Selection 19, 2019

Inventory
Artwork by Matthias A. K. Zimmermann are in the permanent collection of the following museums and cultural institutions

 Technisches Museum Wien, Vienna, Austria
 Odysseum – Science Center, Germany
 Ludwig Museum of Art, Germany
 Museum of Art Aarau, Switzerland
 Buchheim Museum of Fantasy, Germany
 Tucson Museum of Art and Historic Block, USA
 MoFA – Florida State University / Museum of Fine Arts, USA
 St. Anne's Museum Quarter, Lübeck, Germany
 Museum für Kommunikation Frankfurt, Germany
 Museum of Art Göppingen, Germany
 Computer Museum Kiel, Germany
 Computer Games Museum Berlin, Germany
 Toy Museum, Germany
 Museum of Contemporary Art – Collection Hurrle, Germany
 Museet for Religiøs Kunst, Denmark 
 Department of Music, University of Innsbruck

Literature 
 Natascha Adamowsky (ed.): Digital Modernity. The Model Worlds by Matthias Zimmermann. Hirmer Publishers, Munich 2018, 
 Mark R. Hesslinger  / Beate Reifenscheid (ed.): Reality and the Divine – From the Deutschherrenhaus to the Ludwig Museum 1216 – 2016, Ludwig Museum, Koblenz 2016, 
 Christian Huberts, Sebastian Standke (Hrsg.): Between|Worlds: Atmospheres in the Computer Game. Werner Hülsbusch, Glückstadt 2014, 
 Dagmar Fenner (Hrsg.): What can and may art do? An ethical outline. Campus Publishers, Frankfurt a. M. 2013,

Publications about Matthias A. K. Zimmermann (selection) 
 ARD (broadcaster)/Reload, Television publication: Video game art, 7 October 2014
 University of Heidelberg/Publicationsplattform Art History, René Stettler: Various scientific essays.
 Berliner Gazette – Culture, Politics and Digital: Various authors.
 Language at Play – Scientific magazine, Christian Huberts: The re-medialization of procedural atmosphere into static paintings
 Neue Zürcher Zeitung, Gerhard Mack: Digital world – painters use virtual space 
 Basler Zeitung, Graziella Kuhn: Pixel auf Leinwand
 Luzerner Zeitung, Urs Bugmann: A World of Extreme Artificiality
 Luzerner Zeitung, Urs Bugmann: Pictures, perfect like from the computer game
 20 Minuten, Jan Graber: When "Mario" and "Tetris" are hanging in the museum
 Winzavod, Moscow: «Модельные миры»_Маттиас Циммерманн
 The Village, Moscow: В галерее «11.12» открывается выставка Маттиаса Циммермана
 Swiss Embassy in Moscow: Moscow. Matthias Zimmermann at Winzavod
 EA Blog for digital game culture, Martin Lorber: Game Art – Art and digital games: The space machine by Matthias A. K. Zimmermann 
 GamesArt, Davis Schrapel: Miscellaneous articles

References

External links 

 
 
 
 documenta archiv, Kassel: Matthias A. K. Zimmermann
 artlog.net: Matthias A. K. Zimmermann
 Institute for Musicology at the University of Innsbruck. Music after pictures. Composer database: Matthias A. K. Zimmermann
 arthistoricum.net: ART-Dok, Publication platform for art and visual sciences. University of Heidelberg, Matthias A. K. Zimmermann 2012
 arthistoricum.net: ART-Dok, Publication platform for art and visual sciences. University of Heidelberg, Matthias A. K. Zimmermann, 2014
 OPAC. Institute for Modern Art Nuremberg: Matthias A. K. Zimmermann
 European-art.net: Matthias A. K. Zimmermann

21st-century Swiss novelists
Swiss male novelists
Magic realism writers
Swiss artists
1981 births
Living people